KALF is a commercial radio station licensed to Red Bluff, California, and located in Chico, California, broadcasting to Butte, Shasta, Tehama, and Glenn Counties on 95.7 FM.  KALF airs a country music format branded as "New Country 95-7 The Wolf".

External links

ALF
Country radio stations in the United States
Radio stations established in 1978